Eli Schechtman (or Shekhtman or Shechtman) (September 8, 1908 – January 1, 1996) was a Yiddish writer. He defined the purpose of his work as follows: "My mission in Jewish literature was and still is ... to show to those who negate the power of the Galut, how mighty – spiritually and physically – were the generations who grew up in that Galut, even in the most godforsaken places."

In March 1953, several days before the official announcement of Stalin's death, Eli Schechtman was imprisoned as a Jewish nationalist and charged with espionage and Zionism. He was released several months after Stalin's death due to "lack of evidence of guilt".

Schechtman lived and worked in Israel from 1972 until his death in 1996.

Biography
Eli Schechtman was born in the shtetl of Vas'kovychi Korestensky district near Zhytomyr in the Ukraine. He was the seventh of eight children in his family. He received traditional Jewish education at a cheder. Eli Sсhechtman's mother died when he was eight years old, and his father took care of the children. Eli was forced to leave for Zhytomyr to study in a yeshiva at the age of thirteen.

In 1926, Eli Schechtman went to Odessa – a large intellectual center of Jewish life of that time – where he studied literature at the Odessa Jewish Pedagogical Institute from 1929 to 1932.

Marriage
In 1929 Schechtman met Sheindl (Zhenia) Magazinnik, an actress in a Jewish theater got married and in 1932 moved to Kharkiv, and later in 1936 to Kyiv. In 1934 Schechtman joined the Union of Soviet Writers as an active member, where his acceptance was sanctioned by Maxim Gorky, who was the chairman of the Union. During the 1930s Schechtman wrote three novels, all of which were published in Yiddish. He also translated the works of Ukrainian novelists to Yiddish.
.

World War II
On the day following the Nazi's attack on the USSR, and the bombing of Kyiv, Eli Schechtman, and his family were evacuated to Uzbekistan. In 1942 Schechtman voluntarily joined the Red Army. He was injured in 1944, but returned to the front line, and fought as an officer in the Russian army until the end of the war. In May 1945 he was part of the Russian forces who marched to Berlin, and in 1946-1948 he served near Weimar as the Cultural Attaché of the Soviet Forces.

Imprisonment
In 1948 Schechtman left Germany and returned to the USSR. Between 1948 and 1962, the Schechtman's family lived in Kyiv in a communal apartment with 16 neighbours. He couldn't publish his novels and the family struggled to survive, supported only by Sheindl's modest salary as a kindergarten teacher. 
In March 1953, several days before the official announcement of Stalin's death, Eli Schechtman was imprisoned as Jewish nationalist and charged with espionage and Zionism. He was released several months after Stalin's death due to "lack of evidence of guilt".

Last years in the Soviet Union
Upon his release from the Soviet prison, Eli Schechtman began working on one of his major novels, Erev, despite the fact that at that time in the USSR there was not a single magazine, nor a single newspaper or publishing house in Yiddish.
This epic novel, the first Yiddish novel in the USSR, written and published after Stalin's death, became the central work of his literary career. A number of critics praised it as one of the best, or even the best, achievement of post-Holocaust Yiddish prose.

Israel
In 1972 Eli Schechtman and with his wife emigrated to Israel. In 1973 he became the first author to receive an award from the Prime Minister of Israel, Golda Meir, "for literary work in Yiddish." In 1975 a Hebrew translation of the first four parts of  Erev were published.

Eli settled in Jerusalem and began to struggle with the attitude to Yiddish - the language of most Holocaust victims - as to a foreign language in the Jewish state. In the 1980s and 1990s, he became even more critical to the historical and cultural approach of the Israeli establishment to the European diaspora and its culture.
Although Schechtman was honored by several Israeli literary awards, he was dispirited by the status of the Yiddish language in Israel and generally remained suspended from the circle of local Yiddish writers. In 1991, Eli Schechtman, protesting the situation of Yiddish in Israel, refused to get involved in a two-volume Anthology of Yiddish poets and writers (who had ever lived in Israel), whose purpose was to give a complete picture of the Yiddish literature in the country.

Schechtman's literary heritage was eulogized by the writer and literary critic Itche Goldberg in Yidishe Kultur. His full literary heritage is kept in the library of the United States Holocaust Memorial Museum in Washington.

Eli Schechtman died on January 1, 1996, and is buried next to his wife at a cemetery in Kiryat Bialik, Israel.

Novels
Schechtman began writing at the age of twelve.

His collection of stories,  (At the Crossroads, 1930), and especially his novel  (Plowed Stripes, 1932-1936, reprinted in 1941), established him as a prose writer. A prose stylist, he continued the tradition of such writers as Dovid Bergelson and Der Nister. Most of his literary characters are residents of Polesie, a wooded and marshy land between the Ukraine and Belarus. A collection of his short stories -  (Polesie Forests) - was published in 1940.

Upon his release from the Soviet prison, Schechtman began working on one of his major novels, Erev. This was the first novel published in the new and solely Yiddish magazine Sovetish Heymland, which appeared in the USSR in 1961, more than 20 years after the outbreak of WW2 and the defeat of Jewish culture.

The first four books of the novel were serialized Sovetish Heymland and the first two books were published in a single volume by the Moscow publishing house Sovetsky Pisatel in 1965. It was translated into French by Rachel Ertel under the name à la vielle de... in 1964. Into English it was translated under the original name Erev in 1967, by Joseph Singer. On the cover of this book, Eli Shekhtman is compared with Feodor Dostoevsky and Anton Chekhov. In 1975, the first four books of Erev were translated into Hebrew by Zvi Arad and published under the title Beterem.

In 1978, Schechtman suspended work on the novel Erev and began the writing of a large-scale autobiographical novel Ringen oyf der Neshome (The Rings on the Soul). The first and second books of the novel were published in 1981. The novel was translated into Hebrew and was printed twice: the first book was published in 1981, the second one – in 1983, and both books together – in the Classic series in 1992. The third and fourth books of the novel were published in 1988.  translated the entire novel into Russian. The first and second books of the novel were published in 2001 under the title "Rings on the Soul" (in Russian Кольца на душе). The third and fourth books were printed in 2012 under the title "Plowing the Abyss" (in Russian Вспахать бездну).

In 1983, Eli Schechtman finished and published his monumental novel Erev, consisting of seven books, which the author called "The Menorah of My Life." The full novel was translated into Russian by Alma Shin and published in Israel in 2005. "Eli Chekhtman's novel could accompany the magnificent collection of the photographer Roman Vishniac with the title A Vanished World, which has preserved the memory of these Jewish communities in Eastern Europe, destroyed by the Shoah."

In 1988 Eli Schechtman began working on his last novel  (The Last Sunset) which was published in 1994. The novel was translated into Russian by Alma Shin in 2008 and translated into French by Rachel Ertel in 2015. Gilles Rozier in his article "Le Yiddish d'une guerre à l'autre" compares Eli Shekhtman with his contemporaries Vasily Grossman and Varlam Shalamov.
Before his death Eli Schechtman completed several short stories (published posthumously) as a collection, entitled Tristia. Several stories from Tristia were translated into Russian by Alma Shin and were published in 2000 under the name Sonatas.

Awards and honours

 1973, Prime Minister of Israel "For literary work in Yiddish"
 1976, the Chaim Zhitlowsky Prize
 1977, the Eliezer Pines Prize
 1978, Itzik Manger Prize
 1994, the Fernando Jeno Award for literature in Spanish, Hebrew, and Yiddish
 the Congress of Jewish Culture Award

Early works
  (At the Crossroads; 1930)
  (Plowed Stripes,1932)
  (1937; Ukrainian, Faraḳerṭe mezshes; translated by Z. Ioffe)
  by Mykhailo Kotsiubynsky (1940,Kiyeṿ : Melukhe-farlag di natsyonale minderhayṭn in USSR, translated by Eli Schechtman).
  (Polesye Forests, 1940)

Erev (article)
 Erev (Erev, Part 1 & 2, publishing house Sovetsky Pisatel Moscow, 1965)
 á la vielle de...
 Erev (1967; English; Erev, parts 1 & 2; Joseph Singer , New York)
 Beterem (1975; Erev, parts 1–4; translated by Zvi Arad, Tel-Aviv)
 Erev, (1983, EREV, Books 1–7; published in Israel)
 Эрев (2005; Erev Vol I Books 1-4; Alma Shin; Haifa)
 Эрев (2005; Erev Vol II Books 5-7; Alma Shin; Haifa)
 Erev – a la vielle de...

Ringen oyf der neshome (article)
  (1981, Rings on the Soul, Volume [1] was published in Tel-Aviv, Yiśroel-bukh)
  (1992 ; Rings on the Soul part 1 and 2; translated by Yehuda Gur-Arie
  (1988, Rings on the Soul, Volume [2] parts 3 and 4 was published in Tel-Aviv, Yiśroel-bukh,1988)
 Вспахать бездну (2012; Rings of the Soul, parts 3 and 4; translated by Alma Shin; Haifa )

Baim Shkie Aker (article)
 Baim Shkie Aker (בײַם שקיעה-אַקער) (1994) (The last sunset, Yiddishe Kultur ) portrays the tragic story of a Ukrainian Jewish family destined to experience the atrocities of Stalinism and the Holocaust.
 Последний закат  (2008; «Byim shkie aker»,translated by Alma Shin; Haifa )

Tristia (stories) (article)
 Tristia (1996; Tristia; Haifa )
 Сонаты (2000; Sonatas; translated by Alma Shin; Haifa).

See also

Antisemitism in the Soviet Union
Doctors' plot
History of the Jews in Russia and Soviet Union
History of the Soviet Union
Jewish Anti-Fascist Committee
Stalin and antisemitism

References

Further reading
 Eli Shekhtman
 Itshe Goldberg, "Eli Shekhtman, 1908–1996",  11–12, (1996)
 Estraikh, Gennady. 2010. Shekhtman, Eli. YIVO Encyclopedia of Jews in Eastern Europe
 Gennady Estraikh, Yiddish in the Cold War, Oxford, 2008, 
 Simkhovitch, S. (2006 [Mar. 17]): "Eli Shekhtman – tsu zayn tsenten yortsayt", Forverts, pp. 16–17.
Misha Lev, Remembering Eli Schechtman 
 M. Kapeliovitch,Eli Schechtman: Sunrise of "The Last Sunset" 
 Yiddish and the Creation of Soviet Jewish Culture: 1918–1930
 Jewish Virtual Library: The 1970s and After
M. Kapeliovitch, 
USHMM

External links
 
 
 
 
 Кольца на душе, Vol 1,Part 1 (in Russian, performs Alma Shin) on YouTube
 Кольца на душе, Vol 1,Part 2 (in Russian, performs Alma Shin) on YouTube
 Winter sonata (in Russian, performs Alma Shin) on soundcloud
 

1908 births
1996 deaths
Writers from Zhytomyr
20th-century Ukrainian writers
Yiddish-language writers
Writers from Kyiv
Postmodern writers
Soviet military personnel of World War II from Ukraine
Soviet prisoners and detainees
Soviet rehabilitations
Stalinism-era scholars and writers
Soviet Jews in the military
Jewish Ukrainian writers
Ukrainian emigrants to Israel
Itzik Manger Prize recipients